Sports Backers is a non-profit organization founded in 1991 and located in Richmond, Virginia at Sports Backers Stadium. The mission of the Sports Backers has expanded from its beginnings as a traditional sports commission for economic development to be focused on increasing physical activity to improve the health of area residents. The Sports Backers created Movement Makers, a national active living conference to encourage community health organizations that promote physical activity to have a place to gather and learn from each other.  The annual event takes place in Richmond, Virginia and occurs at the same time as Dominion Riverrock. 
The Sports Backers own Dominion Riverrock, the largest outdoor sports and music festival in the country, the Ukrop's Monument Avenue 10k, the 8th largest running race in the United States, and the Anthem Richmond Marathon, the 18th largest marathon in the country. The organization owns and produces 15 events.  The organization also supports other organizations with more than 24 major sports tourism events in the Richmond region receiving annual support through marketing grants, operational assistance and loaning equipment. Sports Backers was named the Member of the Year by the National Association of Sports Commissions in 2006, 2009, 2011 and 2015. Jon Lugbill is the organization's executive director and has been leading the organization since 1993.

The Sports Backers training teams provide local residents a way to prepare for local road races.  The Sports Backers Marathon, Half Marathon and 8k training teams prepared runners for the three races of the Anthem Richmond Marathon.

Active RVA

The Sports Backers added a number of programs in 2012 under the shared moniker of Active RVA, a region-wide initiative to motivate area residents, businesses and local governments to make physical activity a personal and regional priority.  The organization has started a program to certify schools and businesses that go above and beyond to increase physical activity for their students and employees.  Another program encourages the use of stairs through a stairwell signage initiative.  A fitness oasis program exists to increase fitness opportunities in underserved parts of the region.  The success of the Active RVA program is being measured through a combination of community indicators that has resulted in the region receiving a "C" grade for its overall fitness programs.

Bike Walk RVA

The Active RVA effort includes Bike Walk RVA, a program of the Sports Backers to support bike and pedestrian friendly policies, programs and infrastructure projects. The Sports Backers work with area leaders and public works staff to fund and install bike lanes, trails and sidewalks.  The strength of the program is based on 40,000 individuals from around the region that are part of the Bike Walk RVA advocacy database.  These advocates send e-mails, show up at public hearings, write letters and organize support for biking and pedestrian improvements in their neighborhoods.

The Sports Backers measure the success of the Bike Walk RVA program by measuring the total miles of bike lanes, paved trails and dirt trails added each year.  In 2012 the Sports Backers staff rode, ran or walked every mile of existing bike lanes and trails (paved and dirt) in the Richmond region.  The resulting baseline report provides the starting point for the region's bike infrastructure.

Kids Run RVA
Each year, thousands of area youth participate in the Sports Backers' Kids Run RVA program which includes a variety of ways to support and reward youth athletic achievement.  In 2014, there were 10,000 youth that took part in the Kids Challenge running and walking incentive program at elementary schools throughout the Richmond region.  Another program, the Healthy School Challenge rewarded middle and high school students for participating in the Ukrop's Monument Avenue 10k.  A particular emphasis is placed on outreach to underserved schools by offering grants and support to encourage participation in specific programs.

Scholarship program

The Sports Backers have been providing scholarships to area student athletes since 1992.  Since the start of the scholarship program, Sports Backers have given over $660,000 to more than 395 student athletes.   In 2014, the organization provided $65,000 in scholarship funds to area student athletes.  The organization also provides recognition and financial awards for the top high school athletic teams and the "comeback athletes" of the year.

References

 
Physical exercise
Health education in the United States
Sports
Economy of Richmond, Virginia